The 1953–54 Polska Liga Hokejowa season was the 19th season of the Polska Liga Hokejowa, the top level of ice hockey in Poland. 10 teams participated in the league, and Legia Warszawa won the championship.

First round

North Group

South Group

Second round

Final round

5th-8th place

External links
 Season on hockeyarchives.info]

Polska
Polska Hokej Liga seasons
1953–54 in Polish ice hockey